Nenad Šljivić (born 8 June 1985) is a Serbian footballer who plays for BASK.

Career
Previously he played with FK Napredak Kruševac and Russian FC Rostov.

In January 2011, Šljivić signed for Kazakhstan Premier League side FC Tobol. After 5 seasons in Kazakhstan with FC Tobol, Šljivić returned to Serbia at the start of 2016, signing for FK Spartak Subotica on 31 January 2016.

Career statistics

References

External links
 Profile at Srbijafudbal.
 FC Tobol Profile

1985 births
Living people
Sportspeople from Kruševac
Serbian footballers
Serbian expatriate footballers
Expatriate footballers in Russia
Serbian expatriate sportspeople in Russia
Expatriate footballers in Kazakhstan
Serbian expatriate sportspeople in Kazakhstan
Expatriate footballers in Malta
Serbian expatriate sportspeople in Malta
FC Rostov players
FK Napredak Kruševac players
FK Spartak Subotica players
FK Jagodina players
FC Tobol players
Balzan F.C. players
FK Radnički Niš players
FK Budućnost Dobanovci players
FK BASK players
Serbian SuperLiga players
Serbian First League players
Russian Premier League players
Kazakhstan Premier League players
Maltese Premier League players
Association football midfielders